Arthur L. Gratias (May 1, 1920 – March 6, 2015) was an American politician in the state of Iowa.

Gratias was born in Nora Springs, Iowa. He attended Wartburg College and the University of Northern Iowa. He served in the United States Army during World War II, for which he received the Légion d'honneur in 2013. Gratias farmed for 23 years. His career in education included five years of teaching experience and four years as an elementary school principal. Gratias then served 22 years on the school board.  He was a member of the Iowa Senate from 1979 to 1987, serving the 7th and 15th districts as a Republican.

References

1920 births
2015 deaths
People from Nora Springs, Iowa
Military personnel from Iowa
Wartburg College alumni
University of Northern Iowa alumni
Iowa Republicans
Farmers from Iowa
Educators from Iowa
United States Army personnel of World War II
Recipients of the Legion of Honour
Schoolteachers from Iowa
American school principals
20th-century American educators
School board members in Iowa